Curtis G. Maddox (August 10, 1935 – August 21, 2018) was an American football and basketball coach.  He served as the head football coach at Mississippi Valley State College—now known as Mississippi Valley State University—from 1966 to 1967 and Norfolk State University from 1968 to 1971, compiling a career college football coaching record of 17–33–1.  Maddox was also the head basketball coach at Mississippi Valley State for one season, in 1962–63, when the school was known as Mississippi Vocational College.

Maddox was later CEO and president of Cutron General Contractors, Inc. and vice president for operations at Norfolk State.  He died on August 21, 2018.

Head coaching record

Football

References

1935 births
2018 deaths
American football tackles
Basketball coaches from Mississippi
Mississippi Valley State Delta Devils basketball coaches
Mississippi Valley State Delta Devils football coaches
Mississippi Valley State Delta Devils football players
Norfolk State Spartans football coaches
People from Greenwood, Mississippi
African-American coaches of American football
African-American players of American football
20th-century African-American sportspeople
21st-century African-American sportspeople